Roque Federizon Lee, known professionally as Roxlee is a Filipino animator, filmmaker, cartoonist, and painter. Considered by many to be the godfather of young Filipino filmmakers, Roxlee is best known for creating Cesar Asar with his brother, Monlee. Apart from the Lee brothers is their nephew Topel Lee, an audiovisual director of GMA Networks.

Lee began as a cartoonist, first contributing cartoons to Jingle Magazine. Shortly after, he created the comic strip Cesar Asar for Manila Bulletin in collaboration with his brother, Monlee, from 1980 to 2000.
Lee is one of the founding members of Animagination, which has now evolved into Animahenasyon and Sinekalye, a group of filmmakers taking films and music into the street. 
His surreal humor, edgy approach, and originality have been praised by many critics. In the 1980s, his works were done in super-8 film, divided between hand-drawn works like The Great Smoke  and pixelated live-action pieces like Juan Gapang. Although he has not worked in the animation industry, Roxlee’s independent approach to filmmaking has influenced a generation of younger animators, many of whom took up courses at the Mowelfund Film Institute in the 1980s and 1990s. Additionally, he has amassed a cult following in places like Western Europe, Japan, and Singapore. Lee is also into oil painting and has currently finished a book titled Cesar Asar in the Planet of the Noses, a collection of his cartoons and short stories.

Major works and exhibitions 

 1989 - "Spit/Optik" Premieres in Berlinale Forum Section with 8 other RP short films
 1990 - Selection of Roxlee films in "No-Budget Film Festival" in Hamburg, Germany 
 1990 - Retrospective in Hamburg, Germany
 1992 - Roxlee retrospective at Image Forum (Tokyo's Premier Experimental Film Art House) 
 1992 to 1993 - Fellowship Grant in Tokyo, Japan
 1994 - Roxlee retrospective at 18th Hong Kong International Film Festival
 1995 - Roxlee retrospective at Animagination, First Filipino Animation Festival, CCP 
 2004 - Exhibition of over 50 Cartoon Paintings at Singapore International Film Festival 
 2009 - "Green Rocking Chair" in Rotterdam and Singapore International Film Festival
 2008 - Filipino participant at Busan Bienalle Art Festival 
 2011 - A Twist of the Past for the Present + Heat Studies - University of the Philippines Film Center 
 2012- Along with other Filipino artists at Sharjah Bienalle
 2019 - RETROX (Roxlee Retrospective) - UPFI Film Center
 2019 - Kaliskis (Oil Painting Exhibition) - Mono 8 Gallery

Organizational affiliations and positions 

 1978 to 1980 - Cartoonist for Jingle Magazine
 1995 to 1997 - Cartoonist for 1st Yamagata International Film Festival
 1980 to 2000 - comic strip contributor ("Cesar Asar") at Manila Bulletin
 2001 to 2004 - Executive Committee Member of National Committee on Cinema - NCCA (National Commission for Culture and the Arts)

Honors and awards

 1982 to 1985 - Annually won at Experimental Cinema of the Phils. (ECP)
 1986 - Honorable Mention - Experimental Short Film - Kelibia Short Film Festival, Tunisia
 1987 to 1992 - Annually won at Gawad CCP (Cultural Center of the Phils.' Short Film Contest)
 1988 - Best Student Film - Film Academy of the Philippines
 1987 - "Juan Gapang" - Best Experimental Short Film - Gawad Urian Awards
 2006 - Daluyan Awardee (progressive leaders and pioneers in the independent film community in the Philippines) - Philippine Independent Filmmakers' Multi-Purpose Cooperative (IFC) and Robinsons Galleria Movieworld
 2008 - a Tribute at .MOV Digital Film Festival
 2010 - Lifetime Achievement Award - Animahenasyon - Animation Council of the Philippines Incorporated (ACPI)
 2016 - "Manila Scream" (with Blair Camillo and Bob Macabenta ) - Juror's Award for Short Film - Metro Manila Film Festival
 2020 - Lifetime Achievement Award for Alternative Cinema- FAMAS

Filmography 

 1983 - Tronong Puti (White Throne) - shorts
 1984 - Tatlong 'A'(Three A's) - animation
 1984 - The Great Smoke - animation
 1984 - Tao at Kambing (Man and Goat) - animation
 1985 - Inserts - animation
 1985 - ABCD - animation
 1987 - Lizard, or How to Perform in Front of a Reptile - experimental
 1987 - Ink - animation
 1987 - Juan Gapang (Johnny Crawl) - experimental
 1987 - Prayle (Friars)
 1988 - Juan Tunog  - experimental
 1989 - Juan Toga - shorts
 1989 - Pencil
 1989 - Spit/Optik - animation
 1989 - Moron's 
 1989 - Moron's Monolog - experimental
 1990 - Mix 1 & 2 - experimental
 1993 - Tito's Wedding - shorts
 1993 - Harajuko - experimental
 1999 - Cesar Asar - full length film
 2000 - Juan Gulay - shorts
 2001 - Nose 
 2001 - Tronong Puti 2 - shorts
 2003 - Haus of Sing - experimental
 2004 - Two Birds Hit with one Big Stone - experimental
 2005 - Batumbuhay (Live Rock) - documentary
 2005 - Romeo Must Rock - documentary
 2005 - Ghost of Rocker Janis - experimental shorts
 2006 - Left Turn (Juan Kaliwa) - animation
 2006 - 35 MM Man - experimental
 2006 - La Pula (Red Chief) - shorts
 2007 - Musika Dong - documentary
 2007 - Bahay Kubo on Wheels - documentary
 2008 - Monkey and the Turtle - animation
 2008 - Green Rocking Chair (Juan Baybayin Story) - creative documentary
 2017 - Manila Scream - Experimental

The 12 Commandments of Independent Filmmakers 

 Thous shall shoot only original movies with original storyline. Shoot whatever available medium, what is important is the concept.
 Be resourceful, always look for potential sponsors. Shoot films with limited budget but with unlimited ideas. If possible, thou shall only have a maximum of 2 takes per scene.
 Thou shall not be blinded by the stars. If you can eliminate the star complex the better.
 Thou shall not patronize very commercial and trashy movies.
 Thou shall not limit yourself. Always aim for the international release of your films. Remember, your film can be your passport.
 Thou shall not be disrespectful of other filmmakers even if they make bad films.
 Thou shall not be greedy. Share your equipment, film stocks and ideas with other aspiring filmmakers.
 Thou shall not lose hope even if you have little audience for now, maybe the bigger audience will be the next generation to come.
 Thou shall not always aspire for financial gain but always strive for cinematic excellence.
 Thou shall not be bothered by bad reviews of your films. Put in mind there are bad critics everywhere.
 Thou shall not have the feeling of a great director. But humble and recognize the existence of the Supreme Being above.
 Thou shall not lose the passion of making films, just work and work up to the last breath.

References

External links 
 
Animahenasyon

Indies’ world view is Pinoy view

Filipino film directors
Living people
1950 births
People from Naga, Camarines Sur
People from Cainta
National University (Philippines) alumni